Most German chancellors have been followers of a Christian church. German society has been affected by a Catholic-Protestant divide since the Protestant Reformation, and the same effect is visible in this list of German chancellors. It is largely dominated by Catholics and Protestants as these remain the main confessions in the country.

The current German chancellor, Olaf Scholz, is unaffiliated to any church or other religious body; he was raised Protestant.

Details
Most of Germany's chancellors have been either Protestants or Catholics. A significant portion of Protestant chancellors belonged to the Prussian Union of churches, which united the Reformed and Lutheran confessions throughout the Kingdom of Prussia, and was in force since 1817. Some Catholic chancellors came from the Catholic Centre Party. The Christian Democratic Union, a party of both Roman Catholics and Protestants, produced both kinds of chancellors. One chancellor, namely Philipp Scheidemann, was Reformed (Calvinist).

Although there were some religiously sceptic chancellors, most never officially renounced their faith and were given a Christian funeral. Hermann Müller, a Social Democrat heavily influenced by his father-an advocate of Ludwig Feuerbach's views, is the only one notable for not having been a member of any confession  at all. Friedrich Ebert was baptised Roman Catholic, but later officially left the denomination. Gustav Bauer is on record as unaffiliated to any recognised religion at least from 1912 to 1924 (thus including his term of office), but was buried in a Protestant cemetery.

As some chancellors' views are uncertain or causing confusion among researchers, only their official affiliation to a church is mentioned. Due to the German church tax system, legal membership in a church that has the right to collect taxes is officially registered and certain information on this status is available. Actual worldviews are not known for some chancellors; for others, they may clearly differ from the belief system of the church of which they were legal members, as is the case for e.g. Hitler and Goebbels.  A further link to information on their worldviews is given where available, but the absence of such a mention does not mean that other chancellors’ views were necessarily in line with the teachings of their church. For issues pertaining to Nazi stance on religion, see Religion in Nazi Germany, Religious aspects of Nazism, and Religious views of Adolf Hitler.

By term

North German Confederation (1867–1871)

German Reich (1871–1945)

Federal Republic of Germany (1949–present)

Affiliation totals

a. Including two determined opponents of the Roman Catholic faith, Hitler and Goebbels (see Nazi attitudes towards Christianity).

See also
List of prime ministers of Canada by religious affiliation
Religious affiliations of prime ministers of the Netherlands
Religious affiliations of presidents of the United States

References

 
Germany politics-related lists
Germany